The  is one of the largest Japanese keiretsu, or business groups, founded by Masatomo Sumitomo (1585-1652) around 1615 during the early Edo period.

History
The Sumitomo Group traces its roots to a bookshop in Kyoto founded circa 1615 by Masatomo Sumitomo, a former Buddhist monk. Even today, management of the group is guided by his "Founder's Precepts", written in the 17th century.

Copper refining made the company famous. Riemon Soga, Masatomo Sumitomo's brother-in-law, learned Western methods of copper refining. In 1590, he established a smelting business, Izumiya, literally meaning "spring shop". Riemon perfected techniques that allowed the extraction of silver from copper ore, something Japanese technology had not previously accomplished.

The smelting and smithing business was moved from Kyoto to Osaka by the late 17th century. Soga passed control of the company to his son Tomomochi who managed its transformation into a major trading house during the Edo period. Sumitomo began to export copper, import silk, and provide financial services. By 1691, copper mining had been added to the portfolio.

The Meiji Restoration allowed Sumitomo to import and utilize Western machines and techniques in its mines. Sumitomo soon branched out into even more business areas entering the machine and coal industries, as well as the forestry, banking and warehousing businesses becoming a zaibatsu, or business conglomerate.

After World War II, the Japanese zaibatsu conglomerates, including Sumitomo, were dissolved by the GHQ and the Japanese government. The group reformed as a keiretsu, a group of independent companies organized around The Sumitomo Bank (now Sumitomo Mitsui Banking Corporation) and bound together by cross shareholding.

Many companies continue to use the word Sumitomo in their corporate names. Most of them are managed independently and listed at Tokyo Stock Exchange (TSE) and other stock exchanges with highly dispersed shareholders. For some, the name only shows their historic origin, and they are no longer considered part of the Sumitomo Group.

Emblem
The diamond-shaped igeta mark is reminiscent of a type of frame placed over a well in premodern Japan and was the logo of Riemon Soga's Izumiya company.

Current or former Sumitomo Group members

* Nikkei 225 constituent company.

References

External links
  Sumitomo Group Public Affairs Committee
  Company profile and the origins of Sumitomo Official Sumitomo Site
  Sumitomo Corporation website: historical information

 
1630 establishments in Japan
Companies based in Hyōgo Prefecture
Companies based in Osaka Prefecture
Companies established in 1630
Conglomerate companies based in Tokyo
Keiretsu
Mitsui
Zaibatsu